China Academy of Aerospace Electronics Technology, was founded in 1965. It is an indirect shareholder of listed company ZTE (via ZTE Holdings) as well as the largest shareholder of China Aerospace Times Electronics, second largest shareholder of Shaanxi Aerospace Power Hi-Tech. the research institute is a subsidiary of China Aerospace Science and Technology Corporation.

External links
 

Research institutes in China
Government agencies of China
1965 establishments in China